Quşçu is a village in the municipality of Xaldan in the Yevlakh Rayon of Azerbaijan.
Quşçu has population of over 800 people.

References

Populated places in Yevlakh District